Albert Pierce Evans (December 29, 1968 – June 22, 2015) was an American ballet dancer and choreographer. He joined the New York City Ballet in 1988, became a principal dancer in 1995, making him the second African American dancer to hold this position, and had pursue choreography. He retired from performing in 2010, then served as a ballet master until his death.

Early life
Evans was born in Atlanta. He started training in ballet and modern dance after watching The Nutcracker on television. In 1986, he entered the School of American Ballet on full scholarship.

Career
In 1988, Evans joined the New York City Ballet. He was soon given lead roles by choreographers Eliot Feld and William Forsythe, both for NYCB's American Music Festival. He was also cast in other lead roles while being a corps de ballet member. He was promoted to soloist in 1991 and principal dancer in 1995. He was the second African American principal dancer in the company, after Arthur Mitchell, and the sole one during his career. Though he had never worked with George Balanchine, he was known for performing his works. Choreographers he had created roles for includes Alexei Ratmansky, Christopher Wheeldon and Susan Stroman. While he was still performing, he started pursuing choreography, his works include Haiku, Broken Promises, both for NYCB, and Seego for The Washington Ballet.

In June 2010, Evans retired after performing the third (Phlegmatic) variation from Balanchine's The Four Temperaments and Forsythe's Herman Schmerman pas de deux, partnering Wendy Whelan. He then served as a ballet master with the company. He also became an assistant to resident choreographer Justin Peck, and appeared in the documentary Ballet 422, which follows the creation process of Peck's Paz de la Jolla.

Death
On June 22, 2015, Evans died at the Mount Sinai Hospital in New York City following a short illness.

References

External links
New York City Ballet biography

1968 births
2015 deaths
People from Atlanta
American male ballet dancers
New York City Ballet principal dancers
New York City Ballet balletmasters
School of American Ballet alumni
African-American male dancers
Ballet choreographers
African-American choreographers
American choreographers
New York City Ballet Diamond Project choreographers
21st-century American ballet dancers
Dancers from Georgia (U.S. state)
African-American ballet dancers
20th-century American ballet dancers